Smerinthus tokyonis, the Japanese eyed hawkmoth, is a moth of the family Sphingidae. It was described by Shōnen Matsumura in 1921. It is known from Honshu and Shikoku in Japan.

Adults have been recorded in June.

References

Smerinthus
Moths described in 1921
Moths of Japan
Taxa named by Shōnen Matsumura